William Henry Smith,  (1826 – February 1, 1890) was a lawyer and political figure in Nova Scotia, Canada. He represented Queen's County in the Nova Scotia House of Assembly from 1867 to 1874 as a Conservative member.

Background 
He was born on Saint Kitts in the West Indies, the son of James Boyer Smith, who served in the house of assembly for the island. Smith came to Nova Scotia with his family in 1833. In 1849, he was called to the Nova Scotia bar. He married Mary A.E. Poyntz in 1854. He went to England in 1868 with others from the province to request a repeal of Confederation. In 1872, Smith was named Queen's Counsel. He served as probate judge for Shelburne County and registrar of probates for Queen's County. Smith also served as attorney general for the Executive Council of Nova Scotia. He died in Halifax.

References 
The Canadian parliamentary companion, HJ Morgan (1874)
 A Directory of the Members of the Legislative Assembly of Nova Scotia, 1758-1958, Public Archives of Nova Scotia (1958)

1826 births
1890 deaths
Progressive Conservative Association of Nova Scotia MLAs
People from Saint Kitts
Saint Kitts and Nevis emigrants to Canada
Canadian King's Counsel
Members of the Executive Council of Nova Scotia
Judges in Nova Scotia
19th-century King's Counsel